O. indicum may refer to:
 Oidium indicum, a plant pathogen species
 Oroxylum indicum, a tree species found in Asia

See also
 Indicum (disambiguation)